Merhavim Regional Council (Mo'atza Azorit Merhavim) is a regional council in the Southern District of Israel. It covers 14 moshavim, a community settlement, a youth village and an educational institution.

List of communities
Moshavim
Bitha · Eshbol · Gilat · Klahim · Maslul · Nir Akiva · Nir Moshe · Pa'amei Tashaz · Patish · Peduim · Ranen · Sde Tzvi · Talmei Bilu · Tifrah
Community settlement
Mabu'im
Shavei Darom
Youth village
Eshel HaNasi
Other village (educational institution)
Adi Negev

 
Regional councils in Israel
1951 establishments in Israel